This is a list of years in Slovenia.

16th century

17th century

18th century

19th century

20th century

21st century

See also
Timeline of Slovenian history

 
Slovenia history-related lists
Slovenia